Rituale Satanum is the first full length album by the Finnish black metal band Behexen. Its title is a mockery of the religious text of the Catholic faith, Rituale Romanum.

Remastered & re-released in 2004 (with new artwork) by Dynamic Arts Records.                        
LP released by Faustian Distribution & Northern Heritage in June 2006.

Track listing
All lyrics by Marko "Hoath Torog" Saarikalle.  All music by Jani "Horns" Rekola. Copyright Neo Music.

Personnel
Hoath Torog: Vocals
Gargantum: Guitars
Lunatic: Bass
Horns: Drums

Production
Behexen – arranger, recorded by
Anssi Kippo – producer, recorded by
Jussi Jauhiainen – recorded by
Christophe Szpajdel – logo

References

	

2000 debut albums
Behexen albums